Sean M. McDonough (born in 1964) is an American professor of New Testament at Gordon-Conwell Theological Seminary in South Hamilton, Massachusetts, and Chair of the Biblical Studies Department at Pacific Theological College.

Life

Education 

McDonough earned a Bachelor of Arts at Harvard College. He also earned a Master of Divinity in 1993 and a Master of Theology in 1994 from the Gordon-Conwell Theological Seminary. From 1997 he holds a Doctor of Philosophy at the University of St. Andrews, with his doctoral dissertation YHWH at Patmos Rev. 1:4 in its Hellenistic and early Jewish setting.

Teaching 

From 1997-2000 he taught at the Pacific Theological College in Suva, Fiji, where he served as Lecturer in New Testament. Since 2000, he has taught at Gordon-Conwell Theological Seminary in South Hamilton, Massachussetts, where he is associate professor of New Testament and the Chair of the Biblical Studies Department.

Works

Books

Articles

References

Sources 

Living people
1964 births
Gordon–Conwell Theological Seminary faculty
Harvard College alumni
Gordon–Conwell Theological Seminary alumni
Alumni of the University of St Andrews